Naxera is an unincorporated community in Gloucester County, in the U. S. state of Virginia.

Lands End was added to the National Register of Historic Places in 1974.

References

Unincorporated communities in Virginia
Unincorporated communities in Gloucester County, Virginia